Luc Holtz (born 14 June 1969) is a Luxembourgish former international football player. He was the manager of the Luxembourg national under-21 football team. He is currently the manager of the Luxembourg national football team, succeeding Guy Hellers.

Club career
A central midfield playmaker, Holtz started his career at Red Boys Differdange before joining Avenir Beggen for the 1992/1993 season. With Avenir Beggen he immediately won two successive league and cup doubles and he himself claimed the 1993 Luxembourgian Footballer of the Year award.

In 1999, he left them to become player/manager at Etzella Ettelbruck. With Etzella, he immediately won promotion to the Luxembourg National Division in his first season in charge. Also, he brought them their first major silverware by winning the cup in 2001. After relegation in 2002, they got promoted again at the first attempt. In 2003 and 2004 they lost two successive cup finals.

Holtz retired as a player at the end of the 2007/2008 season.

International career
Holtz made his debut for Luxembourg in an October 1991 friendly match against Portugal, which surprisingly ended in a 1–1 draw. He went on to earn 55 caps, scoring one goal. He played in 15 FIFA World Cup qualification matches.

He played his final international game in October 2002, a 0–7 loss against Romania.

Personal life
Holtz's son, Kevin, is also a Luxembourg international footballer, making his debut under Luc.

International goals
Scores and results list Luxembourg's goal tally first.

Honours
Luxembourg National Division: 2
 1993, 1994

Luxembourg Cup: 3
 1993, 1994, 2001

Luxembourgian Footballer of the Year: 1
 1993

Managerial statistics

External links

References

1969 births
Living people
Luxembourgian footballers
Luxembourg international footballers
FC Differdange 03 players
FC Avenir Beggen players
FC Etzella Ettelbruck players
Luxembourgian football managers
Luxembourg national football team managers
Association football midfielders
People from Ettelbruck
FC Etzella Ettelbruck managers